Gujro is a neighbourhood in the Malir district of Karachi, Pakistan, that previously was a part of Gadap Town until 2011.

There are several ethnic groups including Muhajir, Sindhis, Kashmiris, Seraikis, Pakhtuns, Balochis, Memons, Bohras and Ismailis.

References

Neighbourhoods of Karachi
Gadap Town